Fodies are small passerine birds belonging to the genus Foudia in the weaver family Ploceidae.

Description
Males in breeding plumage are usually colourful with bright red or yellow on the head and sometimes elsewhere. Non-breeding males and females are dull, sparrow-like birds with mostly grey-brown plumage.

Fodies are typically found in forest, woodland or scrubland but some also occur in man-made habitats, especially the red fody. Some species feed mainly on seeds while others are largely insectivorous. Fodies build a dome-shaped nest of grass and other plant material. It has a side-opening and it is suspended from a branch or palm leaf.

The genus was introduced by the German naturalist Ludwig Reichenbach in 1850. The type species was subsequently designated as the red fody. Foudi or Fodi is the Malagasy name for the red fody.

Species list
The genus contains eight species:

Distribution
They are native to the islands of the western Indian Ocean where they occur on Madagascar, the Seychelles, the Comoro Islands and the Mascarene Islands. The red fody has also been introduced to the Chagos Archipelago, Bahrain and Saint Helena. While the red fody is one of the most common birds of the region, several of the other fodies are considered to be threatened, particularly the Mauritius fody which is classed as endangered.

References

Sources

 Sinclair, Ian & Langrand, Olivier (1998) Birds of the Indian Ocean Islands, Struik, Cape Town.
 Skerrett, Adrian; Bullock, Ian & Disley, Tony (2001) Birds of Seychelles, Christopher Helm, London.

 
 
Taxa named by Ludwig Reichenbach